Kujawa may refer to:

Places
 Kujawa, Kuyavian-Pomeranian Voivodeship, Poland
 Kujawa, Lubusz Voivodeship, Poland
 Duża Kujawa, a village in north-central Poland

Other
 Kujawa (surname)
 Kujawa Elementary School, see Aldine Independent School District#Early childhood schools

See also
 
 Kujau (disambiguation), a similar surname
 Kujawiak, a Polish folk dance
 Kujawy (disambiguation)